T.D.S.A. Dissanayake  is a Sri Lankan diplomat and writer, who has served as Sri Lankan ambassador to Indonesia and Egypt.

Early life and education
Dissanayake was born to a family of police officers, his father was C. C. "Jungle" Dissanayake a former Senior Deputy Inspector General of Police (SDIG) and his uncle S.A. "Jingle" Dissanayake was a former Inspector General of Police. He was educated at the Royal College Colombo, the University of Ceylon and Harvard University.

After graduating from University of Ceylon he had hope to join the Ceylon Police Force following his family tradition. However he was prevented from doing so when his father was implicated as one of the leaders of the attempted military coup in 1962.

Diplomatic career
He did a spell working in the UN and went on to become Sri Lankan ambassador to Indonesia and Egypt.

Writing career
Since 1975 Dissanayake has published 16 books mostly regarding the politics and history of Sri Lanka.

Bibliography 
 War or Peace in Sri Lanka (2002)
 The Agony of Sri Lanka

See also
Sri Lankan Non Career Diplomats

References

External links

Living people
Ambassadors of Sri Lanka to Indonesia
Ambassadors of Sri Lanka to Egypt
Sri Lankan officials of the United Nations
Sinhalese civil servants
Sri Lankan diplomats
Sinhalese writers
Sri Lankan Christians
Alumni of Royal College, Colombo
Alumni of the University of Ceylon (Colombo)
Harvard University alumni
Year of birth missing (living people)